"The Young Ones" is a single by Cliff Richard and the Shadows. The song, written by Sid Tepper and Roy C. Bennett, is the title song to the 1961 film The Young Ones and its soundtrack album.

With advance orders of over 500,000, it was released in January 1962 on the Columbia (EMI) label and went straight to No. 1 in the UK Singles Chart. It was the first British single to do so since Elvis Presley's "It's Now or Never" in November 1960. It held that position for six weeks and spent 20 weeks in the chart. It has sold 1.06 million copies in the UK, and 2.6m worldwide.

"The Young Ones" was also included on Cliff Richard and the Shadows No. 1 EP Hits from the Young Ones.

Personnel
 Cliff Richard – lead vocals
 Hank Marvin – lead guitar
 Bruce Welch – rhythm guitar
 Jet Harris – bass guitar
 Tony Meehan – drums

Chart performance

In popular culture
In the 1980s, it became the theme song to the alternative comedy sitcom The Young Ones.

See also
List of number-one singles from the 1960s (UK)

References

Songs about teenagers
Comedy television theme songs
1962 singles
Cliff Richard songs
UK Singles Chart number-one singles
Number-one singles in Denmark
Songs written by Sid Tepper
Songs written by Roy C. Bennett
Songs written for films
1961 songs
Columbia Graphophone Company singles
Song recordings produced by Norrie Paramor